Atelecyclus undecimdentatus is a species of crab in the family  Atelecyclidae.

Description
The body of this crab is quite hairy, and has a whitish to cream colour, with purple marks on the carapace. The carapace has a smooth texture and a fringe of long setae. It is and is wider than it is long, growing up to 5 cm long 6.3 cm wide. The postero-lateral margins strongly converge.

Atelecyclus undecimdentatus is often very dirty which can alter its appearance. It has short antennae, being only about a quarter of the length of the carapace. The claws are similar to each other, with black tips. Both the claws and legs have many bristles.

This crab is sometimes mistaken for the more common Atelecyclus rotundatus. However, Atelecyclus rotundatus can be distinguished by its finer granulations and narrower carapace.

Distribution
This species is found in the coastal Atlantic Ocean, the English Channel, and also rarely occurs in the Mediterranean Sea.

Habitat
Atelecyclus undecimdentatus normally lives in waters around 30 metres deep on bottoms ranging from gravel to sandy mud, sometimes under rocks.

References

Cancroidea
Crustaceans of the Atlantic Ocean
Crustaceans described in 1783